TechTown is an urban research and technology business park located just north of the Edsel Ford Freeway (I-94) in the New Center area of Detroit.  The organization defines itself as "a community of entrepreneurs, investors, mentors, service providers and corporate partners creating an internationally recognized entrepreneurial village in the city of Detroit." TechTown is part of the Wayne State University system. It was founded in 2000 by Wayne State University, Henry Ford Health System, and General Motors.

Location
The 12-block,  park is located on the border of Detroit's Midtown and New Center. WSU has a number of its facilities in the TechTown area. The Ford Piquette Avenue Plant, which churned out the first Model T, is a few blocks east of the research park.

References

External links 
 

High-technology business districts in the United States
Economy of Detroit
Wayne State University
Business incubators of the United States
Office buildings completed in 2000
2000 establishments in Michigan